Diploderma flaviceps, the Szechwan japalure, is endemic to China.

References

Diploderma
Reptiles of China
Reptiles described in 1919
Taxa named by Thomas Barbour
Taxa named by Emmett Reid Dunn